Noel Kirsten (27 December 1925 – 30 September 1986) was a South African cricketer. He played in eighteen first-class matches for Border from 1946/47 to 1960/61.

Four of Kirsten's sons played first-class cricket in South Africa, Peter, Andy, Gary and Paul, with Peter and Gary representing South Africa in Test cricket.

See also
 List of Border representative cricketers

References

External links
 

1925 births
1986 deaths
South African cricketers
Border cricketers
Sportspeople from Qonce